Canterbury is an unincorporated community in Kent County, Delaware, United States. Canterbury is located at the intersection of U.S. Route 13 and Delaware Route 15 south of Woodside, north of Felton, and east of Viola.

History
The community was named for the city of Canterbury in England. Canterbury was an important horse changeover along the north–south stagecoach line on the Delmarva Peninsula.

Canterbury's population was 160 in 1890, 162 in 1900, and just 23 in 1960.

References

Unincorporated communities in Kent County, Delaware
Unincorporated communities in Delaware